Lohara may refer to:

People
Lohara dynasty, a dynasty in Kashmir

Andhra Pradesh, India
Lohara, Andhra Pradesh, a village in Adilabad Mandal, Adilabad district

Bihar, India
 Lohara, Nalanda, a panchayat village in Harnaut Tehsil, Nalanda District
 Lohara, Munger, a village in Tetiha Bambor Tehsil, Munger District

Chhattisgarh, India
Lohara, Durg, a village in Dondiluhara tehsil, Durg district
Lohara, Kawardha, a village in Kawardha tehsil, Kawardha district

Maharashtra, India
Lohara, Akola, a village in Balapur Taluka, Akola district
Lohara, Latur, a panchayat village in Udgir Taluka, Latur district
Lohara Tahsil, an administrative division in Osmanabad district
Lohara Bk., a panchayat village in Lohara Taluka in Osmanabad district

Punjab, Pakistan
Lohara, Punjab, a village in Zafarwal tehsil, Narowal District

See also
 Lahore (disambiguation)